LifeBank is a healthcare technology and logistics company based in Lagos, Nigeria. It is a health startup that facilitates the transmission of blood from labs across the country to patients and doctors in hospitals. It was founded in 2016 by Temie Giwa-Tubosun. Facebook founder Mark Zuckerberg stated in 2016 that “This is a thing that needs to exist.”

Establishment and mission 
In July 2012, Giwa-Tubosun founded a non-government organisation called the "One Percent Project" which was aimed at increasing voluntary blood donation across Nigeria. In December 2015, it became LifeBank, which is a commercial endeavour. It also regularly runs blood drives across the state, in collaboration with the state government blood transfusion services, in order to help increase the supply of blood across the state.

See also

International Red Cross and Red Crescent Movement

References

External links
 LifeBank's Website

Companies based in Lagos
Health care companies established in 2012
Health charities in Nigeria
Non-profit organizations based in Lagos
Healthcare in Lagos
Nigerian companies established in 2012